Euro-Sportring is a foundation that organises international sports tournaments, particularly for youth teams. The objective of the foundation is to promote international contacts between sports clubs and similar organisations through the medium of sport, in order to make a contribution to a better understanding between sportsmen of different nationalities and thereby to a united Europe.

Tournaments
The programme comprises approximately 100 football and handball  tournaments in 12 European countries. The numbers of teams participating in a tournament range from 32 seniors to over 200 youth. The tournaments are organised by local partners, mostly sports clubs that are supported by their municipality and the local sports association.

Annually approximately 8,000 teams from over 30 countries take part in the tournaments. Registration for the tournaments is open to teams of amateur clubs and comparable organisations affiliated to an official governing sports body.

Organisation
The activities of the local partners are managed from branches in Western and Central Europe. The head office is located in Baarn, Netherlands. The management operates under the supervision of the foundation's board.

History 
The history of Euro-Sportring goes back to 1951, when the first sports exchange between Haarlem, Netherlands and Saarbrücken, Germany took place. In 1960, Euro-Sportring was registered in Amsterdam as a non-profit foundation. Originally, the sports programmes were held in Germany, the Netherlands, Denmark and Austria. Over the years, other European countries were gradually incorporated to the programme.

Development tournament programme:
 1960s →    Austria  Denmark  Germany  Netherlands 
 1970s →     England  France  Spain 
 1980s →    Belgium  Italy
1990s →    Czech Republic  Croatia
 2000s →  Poland

References

External links
 Official website Euro-Sportring
 Website Wroclaw Trophy

Sports organizations of Europe